Yeezy may refer to:

Adidas Yeezy, a former fashion collaboration between Adidas and American rapper Kanye West
Kanye West
Nike Air Yeezy, a former fashion collaboration between Nike and American rapper Kanye West
Yeezy Gap, a former fashion collaboration between Gap and American rapper Kanye West